Oomappenninu Uriyadappayyan is a 2002 Indian Malayalam-language romantic comedy film directed by Vinayan, written by Kaloor Dennis and produced by P. K. R. Pillai under the banner of Shirdi Sai Creations. It stars Jayasurya in his debut lead role, along with Kavya Madhavan who won the Asianet Film Award for Best Actress. The film marked the film debut of Indrajith Sukumaran and Karthika Mathew.

Plot
Bobby (Jayasurya) is an impoverished mute who earns a living by painting billboards for his boss (Cochin Haneefa). While painting, he falls in love with Gopika (Kavya Madhavan), a rich girl who cannot hear or speak and lives with her father (Sai Kumar) and interpreter (Kalpana). She attends a show performed by Bobby and his friends. Gopika begins to fall in love with Bobby once she learns that he is also a mute. But in order to win Gopika's admiration, Bobby pretends he can speak and puts on a show in front of Gopika's interpreter. Believing that Bobby can speak, Gopika finds her affection for him waning. She eventually learns the truth that Bobby cannot speak and falls in love with him again. Unfortunately, Gopika is betrothed to Shyam (Indrajith), a rich young man, whom she hates. Since Gopika's family is against her relationship with Bobby, they elope.

Shyam's family sends Chellappa (Rajan P. Dev), a police officer, to kill Bobby and bring back Gopika. Meanwhile, Gopika and Bobby hide with a street performing group led by Moopan (Mala Aravindan), but are eventually found by Chellappa.

When Chellappa captures Bobby and Gopika, he brings them both back to a hut near a cliff edge, where he beats Bobby unconscious and tries to rape Gopika. When Gopika knocks Chellappa out, she finds Bobby lying on the floor covered in blood. Thinking he is dead, she decides to walk up to the cliff by the house and jump off. Gopika's family arrives and sees her walking up the cliff and shouts at her to stop. Since Gopika is deaf, she is not able to hear their shouting and continues walking. Bobby wakes up and sees Gopika walking up the cliff. He runs after her and tries to shout but she does not hear him. To get Gopika's attention, Bobby picks up a lemon he finds on a nearby trident and throws it at her; she turns around and sees Bobby. Gopika runs towards Bobby and they embrace.

Cast

Jayasurya as Bobby Oommen
Kavya Madhavan as Gopika Rajashekhara Varma
Indrajith as Shyam Gopal Varma
Sai Kumar as Rajashekhara Varma
Rizabawa as Mukunda Varma
Cochin Haneefa as Punchiri Pushparaj
Harisree Asokan as Kochu Kuttan
Sudheesh as Tomy
Jagadish as Karunan
Kalpana as Kanyaka
Mala Aravindan as Mooppan
Rajan P. Dev as C.I. Chellappa Chettiar
Indrans as Madhavan
Bindu Panikkar as Thresiamma
Karthika Mathew
Baburaj as S. I. Perumal 
Sajitha Betti as Mooppan's daughter 
Sivaji as Dy.S.P.
Yamuna as Shyam's mother
Zeenath

Soundtrack
Mohan Sithara wrote the music for the film's songs and the lyrics were written by Yusafali Kecheri and Vinayan. The music was distributed by Surya Cini Audios, Bluemoon Audios and Rafa International.

Box office
The film was a commercial success at the box office.

Remakes
Both Jayasurya and Kavya Madhavan reprised their roles in the Tamil remake En Mana Vaanil and Jayasurya also starred in the Kannada remake Sogasugara.

References

External links
 
 Oomappenninu Uriyadappayyan review by Unni. R.Nair at Screen India

2000s Malayalam-language films
2002 films
2000s teen romance films
Indian teen romance films
Films about deaf people
Malayalam films remade in other languages
Films directed by Vinayan